Gong Wang is a fictional character in Water Margin, one of the Four Great Classical Novels in Chinese literature. Nicknamed "Flowery Necked Tiger", he ranks 78th among the 108 Stars of Destiny and 42nd among the 72 Earthly Fiends.

Background
Tattoed with the stripes of tiger on his body and a tiger's head on his neck, Gong Wang is nicknamed "Flowery Necked Tiger". A good fighter, he battles with a javelin which he would sometimes hurl to kill. He and Ding Desun are lieutenants of Zhang Qing, the garrison commandant of Dongchang (東昌府; in present-day Liaocheng, Shandong).

Joining Liangshan 
With his deadly stone-flinging skill, Zhang Qing keeps at bay a force from Liangshan Marsh under Lu Junyi that has come to seize the grain stock of Dongchang. Song Jiang, who has just overrun Dongping prefecture, comes to reinforce Lu with his force. Zhang Qing further injures some of Liangshan's best warriors with his stones as they take turn to fight him on horseback or on foot. Gong Wang and Ding Desun stay in the wings preparing to capture any one whom Zhang fells.

When Zhang Qing and Dong Ping grapple with each other on horseback, with their spears discarded, Gong Wang moves to intercept Lin Chong and Hua Rong as they rush to Dong's help. But he is no match for the two and is captured. Gong and Ding, who is seized by Lü Fang and Guo Sheng, are sent in captivity back to Liangshan. After Zhang Qing is captured and won over by Liangshan, Ding and Gong also join Liangshan.

Campaigns and death
Gong Wang is appointed as one of the leaders of the Liangshan infantry after the 108 Stars of Destiny came together in what is called the Grand Assembly. He participates in the campaigns against the Liao invaders and rebel forces in Song territory following amnesty from Emperor Huizong for Liangshan.

Gong Wang is under the command of Huyan Zhuo when Liangshan attacks Deqing County in the campaign against Fang La. While pursuing an enemy officer Huang Ai, he falls into a stream and is speared to death by rival troops.

References
 
 
 
 
 
 
 

72 Earthly Fiends
Fictional characters from Shandong